The given name Salo may refer to:

People
Salo Finkelstein (1896 or 1897–date of death unknown), Polish mental calculator
Salo Flohr (1908–1983), Czech chess player
Salo Grenning (1918–1986), Norwegian illustrator
Salo Landau (1903–1944), Dutch chess player
Salo Weisselberger (1867–1931), Jewish leader, jurist and politician during the Austro-Hungarian Empire and later in Romania
Salo Wittmayer Baron (1895–1989), American historian of Jewish ancestry

Fictional characters
Salo, character in The Sirens of Titan by Kurt Vonnegut